Hugh D. and Martha South Seeds Farm, also known as Eden Hill Farm, is a historic home and farm located at Spruce Creek Township in Huntingdon County, Pennsylvania. The property includes a vernacular stone farmhouse dated to about 1830; a Pennsylvania bank barn dated to about 1880; and the surrounding landscape elements including farm lanes, fence rows, and field patterns. The farmhouse is a -story, five bay, banked limestone dwelling with a full Georgian plan.

It was listed on the National Register of Historic Places in 1999.

References 

Houses on the National Register of Historic Places in Pennsylvania
Georgian architecture in Pennsylvania
Houses completed in 1830
Houses in Huntingdon County, Pennsylvania
1830 establishments in Pennsylvania
National Register of Historic Places in Huntingdon County, Pennsylvania